UFC 238: Cejudo vs. Moraes was a mixed martial arts event produced by the Ultimate Fighting Championship that was held on June 8, 2019 at the United Center in Chicago, Illinois.

Background
The event was headlined by a UFC Bantamweight Championship bout for the vacant title between 2008 Olympic gold medalist in freestyle wrestling and current UFC Flyweight Champion Henry Cejudo and former WSOF Bantamweight Champion Marlon Moraes. Two-time champion T.J. Dillashaw was suspended on March 20 due to a failed drug test in relation to his January loss against Cejudo for the flyweight title and therefore opted to vacate his title before having it stripped. Cejudo became the third man to become UFC champion in two divisions simultaneously and fourth fighter overall (after Conor McGregor at UFC 205, Daniel Cormier at UFC 226 and Amanda Nunes at UFC 232), as well as the seventh person overall to win a title in different divisions.

A UFC Women's Flyweight Championship bout between the reigning champion Valentina Shevchenko and Jessica Eye was the co-main event on the card.

A strawweight bout between Felice Herrig and Yan Xiaonan was scheduled for the event. However, it was reported on April 30 that Herrig withdrew from the event after suffering a torn ACL and was replaced by former Invicta FC Strawweight Champion Angela Hill.

Results

Bonus awards 
The following fighters received $50,000 bonuses:
 Fight of the Night: Tony Ferguson vs. Donald Cerrone
 Performance of the Night: Henry Cejudo and Valentina Shevchenko

See also 

 List of UFC events
 2019 in UFC
 List of current UFC fighters

References 

Ultimate Fighting Championship events
2019 in mixed martial arts
Mixed martial arts in Chicago
Sports competitions in Chicago
2019 in sports in Illinois
June 2019 sports events in the United States
Events in Chicago